Hiroshi Tsuruya (born December 8, 1970) is a Japanese mixed martial artist. He competed in the Lightweight and Welterweight divisions.

Mixed martial arts record

|-
| Win
| align=center| 7-2-3
| Tomohiko Yoshida
| Submission (lapel choke)
| Zst: Swat! in Face 1
| 
| align=center| 2
| align=center| 2:22
| Tokyo, Japan
| 
|-
| Loss
| align=center| 6-2-3
| Vítor Ribeiro
| Decision (unanimous)
| Shooto: Treasure Hunt 10
| 
| align=center| 3
| align=center| 5:00
| Yokohama, Kanagawa, Japan
| 
|-
| Win
| align=center| 6-1-3
| Andy Wang
| Decision (unanimous)
| SB 23: SuperBrawl 23
| 
| align=center| 3
| align=center| 5:00
| Honolulu, Hawaii, United States
| 
|-
| Win
| align=center| 5-1-3
| Koji Takeuchi
| Decision (unanimous)
| Shooto: To The Top 9
| 
| align=center| 2
| align=center| 5:00
| Tokyo, Japan
| 
|-
| Win
| align=center| 4-1-3
| Shigetoshi Iwase
| Decision (unanimous)
| Shooto: Gig East 3
| 
| align=center| 2
| align=center| 5:00
| Tokyo, Japan
| 
|-
| Draw
| align=center| 3-1-3
| Kim Mason
| Draw
| Shooto: Wanna Shooto 2001
| 
| align=center| 2
| align=center| 5:00
| Setagaya, Tokyo, Japan
| 
|-
| Draw
| align=center| 3-1-2
| Seichi Ikemoto
| Draw
| Shooto: R.E.A.D. 9
| 
| align=center| 2
| align=center| 5:00
| Yokohama, Kanagawa, Japan
| 
|-
| Win
| align=center| 3-1-1
| Tomonori Ohara
| Submission (kimura)
| Shooto: R.E.A.D. 6
| 
| align=center| 1
| align=center| 0:50
| Tokyo, Japan
| 
|-
| Win
| align=center| 2-1-1
| Masakazu Kuramochi
| Submission (armbar)
| Shooto: R.E.A.D. 1
| 
| align=center| 1
| align=center| 1:51
| Tokyo, Japan
| 
|-
| Win
| align=center| 1-1-1
| Tatsuharu Doi
| Submission (armlock)
| Daidojuku: WARS 5
| 
| align=center| 1
| align=center| 1:18
| Japan
| 
|-
| Loss
| align=center| 0-1-1
| Takanori Gomi
| Decision (unanimous)
| Shooto: Las Grandes Viajes 6
| 
| align=center| 2
| align=center| 5:00
| Tokyo, Japan
| 
|-
| Draw
| align=center| 0-0-1
| Takaharu Murahama
| Draw
| Shooto: Gig '98 2nd
| 
| align=center| 2
| align=center| 5:00
| Tokyo, Japan
|

See also
List of male mixed martial artists

References

1970 births
Japanese male mixed martial artists
Lightweight mixed martial artists
Welterweight mixed martial artists
Mixed martial artists utilizing judo
Mixed martial artists utilizing kickboxing
Mixed martial artists utilizing wrestling
Mixed martial artists utilizing Brazilian jiu-jitsu
Japanese practitioners of Brazilian jiu-jitsu
People awarded a black belt in Brazilian jiu-jitsu
Japanese male sport wrestlers
Amateur wrestlers
Japanese male judoka
Living people